Thermochrous neurophaea is a species of moth of the Anomoeotidae family, discovered by Erich Martin Hering in 1928. It is found in Tanzania.

References

Endemic fauna of Tanzania
Anomoeotidae
Insects of Tanzania
Moths of Africa